Jordanhill railway station is a side-platformed suburban railway station in the Jordanhill area in the West End of Glasgow, Scotland. The station, which is governed by Transport Scotland and managed by ScotRail, lies on the Argyle Line and the North Clyde Line. In operation since 1887, the station stemmed losses for an area that was in decline.

It is located near the Jordanhill Campus of the University of Strathclyde and sits atop Crow Road, an important western thoroughfare in Glasgow and the main route to the Clyde Tunnel.

History

Early history
The station opened on 1 August 1887 as part of the Glasgow, Yoker and Clydebank Railway. Construction of the station structure was not completed until 1895, with modular-design wooden buildings, commonly seen on the new suburban railway lines, being built on both platforms. This is an important part of the station's history. The station is located on part of the former site of brick and tile works; Jordanhill being an area of artisans and miners until the close of the nineteenth century. The railway station arrived just as much of the local industry was declining, giving residents, who previously had to walk to Hillhead or Partick to find transport into Glasgow, proper access to the city centre.

The station's opening effectively filled a gap in provision, as lines in the area had already been constructed; the Whiteinch and Stobcross Railways both opened in 1874, but no station was constructed on these lines at Jordanhill. A new link allowed services to Whiteinch Victoria Park to begin in 1897, but they ceased in 1951 and the link was closed to freight in 1967. The route of the link has been converted into a nature walk from Victoria Park to Jordanhill station, running alongside the existing line for approximately half its length.

On 15 January 1898, J. Johnstone, a member of the Whiteinch Harriers running club, was killed while attempting to run across the line west of the station. A small lead memorial stood on the spot for many years. The freight line saw near-disaster on 28 December 1932, when seventeen wagons laden with coal ran away on a slight incline on the sidings operated by the Great Western Steam Laundry; they ran into other wagons, derailing nine and spilling coal over the line, seriously disrupting passenger traffic.

A serious accident occurred on 28 April 1980, when a three-coach train carrying 80 passengers from Dalmuir to Motherwell derailed at Hyndland West Junction, just after leaving Jordanhill. All the bogies on the leading coach left the rails, causing fifteen people (nine women and six men) to be injured seriously enough for them to be taken to the Western Infirmary.

Plans for rebuilding 

In 1998, Strathclyde Passenger Transport (SPT) undertook a study into the possible relocation of the station west to Westbrae Drive. By 2004, SPT had identified this station as one of their top three priorities, and Glasgow City Council had identified it as a "main priority".

An alternative proposal would keep the existing station open but with many services calling only at a new Westbrae Drive station. This proposal was backed in August 2001 by Charlie Gordon, then leader of Glasgow City Council, who said that having a second station in Jordanhill would assist students at the nearby Jordanhill campus of the University of Strathclyde. The proposed new station would have been only roughly 500 yd (460 m) away.

The station at Jordanhill is to be rebuilt, one of six new stations in the west of Scotland, according to an announcement made on 19 May 2006 by SPT chief executive Ron Culley.

Jordanhill Station will be rebuilt for the 2014 Commonwealth Games, one of a number of stations that will be rebuilt for the Commonwealth Games through a £300 million transport legacy plan.

Services 

As part of the Argyle Line, the station is used—along with Glasgow Central and Anderston—by those commuting to and from Central Glasgow, near the heart of its business and financial district. The typical hourly service from the station is four trains per hour to Dalmuir via Yoker (two extended to ), two trains to  via Glasgow Central and two trains to Cumbernauld via Glasgow Queen Street.

In SRA's 2002/3 financial year, 85,861 people boarded trains at Jordanhill station, and 94,613 disembarked, making it the 1,029th busiest station in the United Kingdom, and twenty-fifth busiest on the Argyle Line in 2003.

In 2016, the Queen Street High Level tunnel closure saw restricted services for part of the year, with frequencies dropping to half-hourly from here.

Facilities 

The station has a very small car park (eleven spaces) and is not permanently staffed, but it contains a ticket machine, one of an initial batch of ten installed by SPT in late 2003 and early 2004 as part of a drive to curb fare dodging, which was estimated to be costing the company £2 million a year. Both platforms are elevated and each has a wheelchair ramp. There is a connecting footbridge between the two platforms.

In the area 

The Jordanhill Campus of the University of Strathclyde, which hosts the Faculty of Education, is located nearby. Several schools are also in the area, including Jordanhill School, Broomhill Primary, St Thomas Aquinas; as well as a Territorial Army centre. For the later part of the 1980s and the early part of the 1990s, a huge Jolly Giant toy centre lay just across Crow Road, and was a major local attraction. It closed in the 1990s and after housing a discount clothing store for a few years it is now a Volkswagen car dealership.

Backing onto platform 2 is a Scout hall, home to the 72nd Scout Troop.

There are two sports facilities accessible from the station:
New Anniesland, a rugby union and cricket playing field is home to the Glasgow Academicals Sports Club and The Glasgow Academy.
Old Anniesland, home to The High School of Glasgow and the GHK Sports club.

Rugby union team Glasgow Hawks RFC predominantly play at Old Anniesland, but occasionally play at New Anniesland.

References

External links 

  
Station facilities from First ScotRail
 RailScot: Glasgow, Yoker and Clydebank Railway
 Map of rail area from Sustrans (UK)
 Picture of the station in 1953

Railway station
Railway stations in Glasgow
Former North British Railway stations
Railway stations in Great Britain opened in 1887
SPT railway stations
Railway stations served by ScotRail
1887 establishments in Scotland